is a Japanese footballer who plays for Iwaki FC.

Club statistics
Updated to 23 February 2020.

References

External links
Profile at Iwaki FC
Profile at Nagano Parceiro

1995 births
Living people
Association football people from Fukuoka Prefecture
Japanese footballers
J3 League players
Japan Football League players
AC Nagano Parceiro players
Azul Claro Numazu players
Iwaki FC players
Association football forwards